The following is a list of awards and nominations received by James Cromwell.

Cromwell, an actor, has nearly 200 film and television credits to his name. He gained critical recognition for his performance in the 1995 film Babe for which he was nominated for the Academy Award for Best Supporting Actor. He also appeared in films such as L.A. Confidential (1997), The Green Mile (1999), The Queen (2006), and The Artist (2011). He is also a five time Primetime Emmy Award nominee, winning once in 2013 in the Outstanding Supporting Actor in a Miniseries or a Movie category for American Horror Story: Asylum. He also appeared in Six Feet Under (2003–05), 24 (2007), American Horror Story: Asylum (2012), and Halt and Catch Fire (2015).

Major associations

Academy Awards

Primetime Emmy Awards

Screen Actors Guild Awards

Critics Choice Awards

Miscellaneous awards

Blockbuster Entertainment Awards

Canadian Screen Awards

Teen Choice Awards

References

External links
 

Cromwell, James